Hemiargus hanno, the hanno blue is a species of butterfly in the family Lycaenidae. It is found in Suriname, Brazil, Colombia, Cuba, the Netherlands Antilles, Puerto Rico and Hispaniola.

Subspecies
Hemiargus hanno hanno - Surinam, Brazil
Hemiargus hanno bogotana Draudt, 1921 - Panama and Colombia
Hemiargus hanno filenus (Poey, 1832) - Bahamas, Turks & Caicos, Cuba, Cayman Islands

References
 

 

Polyommatini
Butterflies of the Caribbean
Lycaenidae of South America
Lepidoptera of Brazil
Lepidoptera of Colombia
Lepidoptera of Cuba
Butterflies described in 1790
Taxa named by Caspar Stoll